Villianur is one of the 4 Firkas of Villianur taluk in Pondicherry (North) Revenue Sub-division of the Indian union territory of Puducherry.

Revenue villages
The following are the revenue villages under Villianur Firka

 Ariyur
 Kizhur
 Kurumbapet
 Manakuppam
 Mangalam
 Odiampet
 Perungalur
 Sathamangalam
 Thirukanji
 Uruvaiyar
 Villianur

See also
Kodathur firka
Mannadipet firka
Thondamanatham firka

References

External links
 Department of Revenue and Disaster Management, Government of Puducherry

Geography of Puducherry
Puducherry district